Shotwick Park is a small settlement and former civil parish, in the unitary authority of Cheshire West and Chester and the ceremonial county of Cheshire, England. The civil parish was abolished on 1 April 2015 to form Saughall and Shotwick Park, with part also incorporated into the parish of Puddington.

The area is the location of the remnants of Shotwick Castle, built about 1093 by Hugh Lupus, 1st Earl of Chester. 
This Norman motte and bailey fortification was constructed as part of the Welsh border defences in the area. The land surrounding the castle became enclosed as a park in 1327.
By the 1620s, the castle was in a ruinous condition.

According to the 1831 edition of A Topographical Dictionary of England, Shotwick Park was "an extra-parochial liberty" within the Wirral Hundred. The liberty comprised "970 acres, the soil of which is clay." 
It became a civil parish in 1858. The population was recorded at 25 in 1801, 13 in 1851, 8 in 1901, 78 in 1951 and 56 in 2001.

Shotwick Park is a rural residential area with communal amenities provided in the nearby village of Saughall. A small industrial estate development also exists at Shotwick Park.

See also

Listed buildings in Shotwick Park

References

External links

Former civil parishes in Cheshire
Cheshire West and Chester